Graciela Calderón is an activist in Socialist Left (Argentina).

She was elected as a deputy in the legislature of Buenos Aires Province in 2021, as a candidate of the Workers' Left Front, alongside Guillermo Kane.

She comes from La Matanza Partido

Sources

Socialist Left (Argentina) politicians
People from La Matanza Partido
Living people
Year of birth missing (living people)